Weronika Hallmann (born 20 July 2000) is a Polish swimmer. She competed in the women's 200 metre breaststroke at the 2019 World Aquatics Championships.

In 2017, she won the silver medal in the girls' 50 metre breaststroke at the 2017 European Junior Swimming Championships held in Netanya, Israel.

References

External links
 

2000 births
Living people
Polish female breaststroke swimmers
Place of birth missing (living people)
Swimmers at the 2018 Summer Youth Olympics